Attagenus (Aethriostoma) undulatus, is a species of skin beetle found in Comoros, Madagascar, Mauritius, Seychelles, Buru Island, Cambodia, southern China, India, Indonesia, Laos, Malaysia, Myanmar, Philippines, Sri Lanka, Thailand, Vietnam, Hawaiian Islands, Papua New Guinea, and South Mariana Islands. It has introduced to Chile mainly through goods of human beings.

Body length is about 3 mm.

References 

Dermestidae
Insects of Sri Lanka
Insects described in 1858